Dolores Redondo Meira (born 1 February 1969) is a Spanish writer of noir novels, author of the Baztán Trilogy, and winner of the 2016 Premio Planeta de Novela literary prize.

Biography 
Dolores Redondo began studying for her law degree at the University of Deusto, though she did not complete it. She studied gastronomy in San Sebastián, worked in several restaurants, and had her own before devoting herself professionally to literature.

Redondo began writing literature with short stories and children's stories. In 2009 she published her first novel, Los privilegios del ángel, and in January 2013 she published El guardián invisible, the first volume of the Baztán Trilogy. The second part, titled Legado en los huesos, followed in November of that year, and it finished in November 2014 with Ofrenda a la tormenta. The trilogy has gone on to sell more than 700,000 copies and has been translated into more than 15 languages.

The German producer Peter Nadermann, responsible for films of the Millennium series of Stieg Larsson, acquired the rights to its film adaptation almost immediately after the publication of the first novel. The film premiered in 2017.

Redondo is the winner of the 2016 Premio Planeta de Novela for the manuscript of Todo esto te daré, which was presented to the contest under the pseudonym Jim Hawkins with the false title Sol de Tebas.

Works

Todo esto te daré 
Winner of the Planeta Prize. Published by Planeta.

El guardián invisible (The Invisible Guardian) 
The first title of the trilogy begins with the discovery, on the banks of the river Baztán, the naked body of a teenager (Ainhoa Elizasu). The Policía Foral homicide inspector Amaia Salazar is put in charge of the investigation, which leads her to return to Elizondo, the hometown she always wanted to escape from.

The story moves between two fronts – professional, focused on solving a series of murders, and personal, which in this case becomes as important and surprising as the outcome of the investigation.

A film adaptation was released on 3 March 2017.

Legado en los huesos (The Legacy of the Bones) 
Although the first volume completed the plot of the investigation, the second installment begins with the trial against the stepfather of a young woman, Johana Márquez. Amaia Salazar is called on by the police just after the accused has committed suicide in the bathroom of the courthouse and left a note with a single message: "Tarttalo". Amaia must discover its meaning and at the same time uncover disturbing details of her past.

A film adaptation was released in October 2019.

Ofrenda a la tormenta (Offering to the Storm) 
The last entry in the trilogy was presented to the public on 25 November 2014.

During the presentation, the author admitted that the idea which inspired the whole story was for readers to understand that "even though many magical elements appear, the novel is very real and current."

A film adaptation was released in July 2020.

La cara norte del corazón (The North Face of the Heart) 
Published 10 December 2019 by Planeta Publishing, La cara norte del corazón is a prequel to the trilogy above and explains Amaia Salazar's youth and education in FBI in United States.

In 2021, NBC Universal acquired the rights to adapt the novel into a television series format, to be produced by Heyday Films.

Chanchigorri cakes 
One of the peculiarities of the novels of Dolores Redondo is the appearance of chanchigorri cakes. The novels have made them better known outside of Navarre, where they are a popular dessert.

References

External links 
  

1969 births
21st-century Spanish novelists
Crime novelists
Living people
People from San Sebastián
Spanish women novelists
21st-century Spanish women writers
Spanish crime fiction writers